Running Wilde is an American sitcom created by Mitchell Hurwitz for the Fox Network. It stars Will Arnett as Steve Wilde, a self-centered, idle bachelor and heir to an oil fortune. The series follows Wilde's awkward attempts to regain the affection of his childhood sweetheart, Emmy, an environmentalist who had been living in the South American jungle, but whose young daughter does not want to return there and who secretly enlists Steve's help to keep Emmy at his mansion, leading to farcical situations and misunderstandings.

Background
Mitchell Hurwitz, Arnett and fellow cast member David Cross had previously worked together on Fox's Arrested Development. Running Wilde had many stylistic similarities to Arrested Development, including frequent cutaway gags and a narrator (Emmy's daughter Puddle, played by Stefania LaVie Owen) who comments on the characters' motivations. Moreover, the series appears to exist in the same universe as Arrested Development, as the fictional Bluth Company from Arrested Development is responsible for the design of the nightclub in the penultimate episode "The Pre-nup". The series provided the first U.S. network TV role for British actor-comedian Peter Serafinowicz, who plays Wilde's idle-rich friend and neighbor Fa-ad Shaoulin.

The show premiered on September 21, 2010. The show was canceled mid-season because of low ratings after just 13 episodes had been produced. The last four episodes of the series were shown on FX in late April and May 2011.

The show was shot at Sands Point Preserve, Long Island, New York. Keri Russell commuted from her home in Brooklyn, about 25 miles away, and Arnett commuted from his home in Manhattan. Production assistants searched for props at a Macy's in nearby Manhasset.

Plot
The show centers on Steven Wilde, a self-centered billionaire who is clueless about the real world. He has problems with depression and often self-medicates with excessive drinking. Emmy Kadubic, Steve's high-school sweetheart, is an activist who lives in a rainforest along with her daughter Puddle and her "eco-terrorist" boyfriend Dr. Andy Weeks. Puddle refuses to speak as an attempt to force her mother to move out of the rainforest. Steve invites Emmy to a party where he is to accept an award. Intrigued that Steve may have finally become a better person, she decides to attend but discovers that his own company is giving him the award.

Liberated from the jungle, Puddle finally decides to speak and conspires with Steve to convince Emmy to stay at Steve's estate. Emmy agrees to stay for Puddle, but only in the treehouse that Steve had originally built for her when they were young. As Steve tries to win back Emmy despite Andy's interference, Emmy vows to change him into a more selfless person.

Cast and characters

Main cast
 Will Arnett as Steven Wilde
 Keri Russell as Emmy Kadubic
 Robert Michael Morris as Mr. Lunt
 Mel Rodriguez as Migo Salazar
 Stefania LaVie Owen as Puddle Kadubic
 Peter Serafinowicz as Fa'ad Shaoulin
David Cross as Dr. Andy Weeks

Casting
The first version of the pilot was filmed with Jayne Houdyshell and Joseph Nunez in the roles of Robert Michael Morris and Mel Rodriguez, but when the pilot was re-shot, casting changes were made. Though neither actor appeared in the finished pilot product, they are both credited in it. Andy Daly played David Cross's part in the original pilot after the eruption of the Eyjafjallajökull volcano stopped Cross from traveling out of the United Kingdom in time for the shoot in North America; Daly, who was contracted to The Paul Reiser Show, was hired with the knowledge that he would be replaced by Cross if Running Wilde was picked up as a series.

Episodes

Cancellation
The show was pulled from November sweeps and on November 30, 2010, Fox announced that no new episodes would be ordered. Although the five remaining episodes were to air through December, Fox postponed two of them to air at the end of the month. At the 2011 Television Critics Association tour, Fox announced that the show was officially canceled. The remaining episodes were aired starting April 28, 2011 on FX.

References

External links
 

2010s American romantic comedy television series
2010s American single-camera sitcoms
2010 American television series debuts
2011 American television series endings
Television shows set in New York (state)
English-language television shows
Fox Broadcasting Company original programming
Television series by 20th Century Fox Television
Television series by Lionsgate Television
Television shows filmed in Vancouver
Television series created by Mitchell Hurwitz